ERA-63, also known as ORG-37663, as well as 3-methylene-7α-methyl-17α-ethynylestra-5(10)-en-17β-ol, is a synthetic, steroidal estrogen and a selective agonist of the ERα that was under development for the treatment of rheumatoid arthritis but was never marketed. The drug produced estrogenic effects but failed to show effectiveness for rheumatoid arthritis in a phase IIa clinical study. A large clinical trial also found that prinaberel (ERB-041), a selective ERβ agonist, was ineffective in the treatment of rheumatoid arthritis in spite of activity in preclinical models.

See also
 16α-LE2
 ERA-45
 GTx-758
 Methylpiperidinopyrazole
 Propylpyrazoletriol

References

Ethynyl compounds
Estranes
Synthetic estrogens
Abandoned drugs
Vinylidene compounds